Deirdre Quinn (born 1973) is an American model and actress, known for her role as Miss Texas in the 2000 film Miss Congeniality.

Biography
Quinn grew up outside of Philadelphia, and is a graduate of Germantown Academy. She is a graduate in Theatre from Lynchburg College and NYU. At the age of 12, she got discovered by a photographer at a bat-mitzvah, and soon was signed to Wilhelmina Models, appearing in many campaigns, including a commercial for Irish Spring.

She is known for her roles as Miss Texas, Sandra Bullock's roommate in the mega comedy hit, Miss Congeniality, "Texas" Tina in the television series Heroes, and roles in films such as Aces 'N' Eights, The Last Dance, The Diary of Ellen Rimbauer, and appearances in CSI: Crime Scene Investigation, CSI: NY and K-Ville.

Quinn married Brett Karns on April 4, 2004. Their wedding was featured in the Summer 2005 edition of American bridal magazine Inside Weddings. Ever since the birth of her daughter, Quinn has mostly remained as a housewife to raise her.

References

External links
 
 

American film actresses
American television actresses
Living people
University of Lynchburg alumni
1973 births
Place of birth missing (living people)
Actresses from Philadelphia
Germantown Academy alumni
Housewives
21st-century American women